Ministry of Science and Innovation may refer to:
 Ministry of Science (Spain)
 Ministry of Science and Innovation (New Zealand)